John Moody may refer to:

John Moody (actor) (1727?–1812), Irish actor
John Moody (badminton) (born 1983), badminton player from New Zealand
John Moody (financial analyst) (1868–1958), U.S. financial analyst and investor
John Moody (footballer) (1904–1963), English football goalkeeper
John Moody (governor) (d. 1736), deputy governor of Placentia, Newfoundland
John Moody (journalist), Fox News executive
John Moody (opera director) (1906–1993), English opera director
John M. Moody (died 1884), member of the Utah Territorial Legislature
John Moody (Cash Cab)

See also
John Moodie (1859–1944), Canadian manufacturer
John Mudie, Scottish footballer